The 1969 Missouri Tigers football team was an American football team that represented the University of Missouri in the Big Eight Conference (Big 8) during the 1969 NCAA University Division football season. The team compiled a 9–2 record (6–1 against Big 8 opponents), finished in a tie for the Big 8 championship, lost to Penn State in the 1970 Orange Bowl, was ranked No. 6 in the final AP Poll, and outscored opponents by a combined total of 365 to 191. Dan Devine was the head coach for the 12th of 13 seasons. The team played its home games at Memorial Stadium in Columbia, Missouri.

The team's statistical leaders included Joe Moore with 1,312 rushing yards, Terry McMillan with 1,963 passing yards and 2,157 yards of total offense, Mel Gray with 705 receiving yards, and Henry Brown with 71 points scored.

Schedule

Game summaries

Michigan

Kansas

    
    
    
    
    
    
    
    
    
    
    
    
    

Terry McMillian broke the Big Eight single-season touchdown pass record of 16 and the single-game school record of Paul Christman. The victory gave Missouri a share of the Big Eight title with Nebraska and a berth in the Orange Bowl.

Roster

Awards
All-Big Eight: E Mel Gray, OT Larron Jackson, DT Mark Kuhlmann, S Dennis Poppe
Missouri Sports Hall of Fame – inducted as a team on January 25, 2015.

References

Missouri
Big Eight Conference football champion seasons
Missouri Tigers football seasons
Missouri Tigers football